The 2006–07 Ukrainian Hockey League season was the 15th season of the Ukrainian Hockey League, the top level of ice hockey in Ukraine. Six teams  participated in the league, and HK ATEK Kyiv won the championship.

Major League standings

References

External links
Ukrainian Ice Hockey Federation 

UKHL
Ukrainian Hockey Championship seasons
Ukr